The South Australian Railways Ga Class locomotive was built in 1874 by Robert Stephenson and Company for the Adelaide Glenelg & Suburban Railway Company and entered service as No. 3. In November 1881, this locomotive was sold to the Glenelg Railway Company and became their No. 3. On the 16th of December 1899 this locomotive entered service on the South Australian Railways as Ga class No. 157, after the SAR purchased the Glenelg Railway Company. Ga class No. 157 was rebuilt at Islington Railway Workshops in November 1902 and condemned in May 1915, finally being scrapped in 1922.

References

Ga
Broad gauge locomotives in Australia
Robert Stephenson and Company locomotives
4-4-0T locomotives
Railway locomotives introduced in 1874

Passenger locomotives 
Scrapped locomotives